Ballenger Creek is an unincorporated community and census-designated place (CDP) in Frederick County, Maryland, United States. It is a part of the Frederick, Maryland urban area and is adjacent to Frederick's southern city limits. The CDP had a 2010 census population of 18,274.

Geography
Ballenger Creek is located in south-central Frederick County at  (39.381593, −77.432802). The namesake stream flows from west to east through the community towards the Monocacy River, part of the Potomac River watershed.

Demographics

As of the census of 2010, there were 18,274 people, 6,932 households, and 4,558 families residing in the CDP. The racial makeup of the CDP was 69.7% White, 15.6% African American, 0.4% Native American, 6.6% Asian, 0.1% Pacific Islander, 3.2% from other races, and 4.3% from two or more races. Hispanic or Latino of any race were 10.1% of the population.

There were 4,542 households, out of which 24.9% had children under the age of 18 living with them, 47.4% were married couples living together, 12.6% had a female householder with no husband present, and 35.7% were non-families. 28.5% of all households were made up of individuals, and 9.5% had someone living alone who was 65 years of age or older. The average household size was 2.57 and the average family size was 3.22.

In the CDP, the population was spread out, with 26.7% under the age of 18, 8.5% from 18 to 24, 34.3% from 25 to 44, 22.4% from 45 to 64, and 8.1% who were 65 years of age or older. The median age was 33.5 years. For every 100 females, there were 96.9 males. For every 100 females age 18 and over, there were 94.9 males.

The median income for a household in the CDP was $56,558, and the median income for a family was $65,216. Males had a median income of $42,350 versus $31,233 for females. The per capita income for the CDP was $24,816. About 3.2% of families and 3.6% of the population were below the poverty line, including 3.9% of those under age 18 and 5.8% of those age 65 or over.

Business community
Ballenger Creek's establishment as an urban community and continued development has been strongly tied to the presence of numerous corporate and technology companies located within the I-270 Technology Corridor. Ballenger Creek is the site of many of the corporate parks that contribute substantially to the Frederick area economy, including Frederick Research Park, Stanford Industrial Park, Westview South, Westview Village, Wedgewood Business Park, McKinney Industrial Park, Westview Corporate Campus, Ballenger Center, Frederick Corporate Park and 270 Technology Park.

Schools
Tuscarora High School
Ballenger Creek Elementary School
Orchard Grove Elementary School
Tuscarora Elementary School
Ballenger Creek Middle School
Crestwood Middle School

References

Census-designated places in Maryland
Census-designated places in Frederick County, Maryland